"No-One Driving" is a 1980 song by UK artist John Foxx, and was released as a single in March 1980. It was the second single release from the Metamatic album, after "Underpass". The song is typical of Foxx's musical output of the time, featuring a Ballardian dystopian scenario involving an automobile in the lyrics, with music produced using electronic instruments (synthesisers, drum machines, electronic percussion) only.

The single was released as a limited edition double 7" disc with three accompanying tracks, and as a single 7" both as two track and three track discs with the same catalogue number.
The single version is slightly different from the album version in sound mix and lyrics; the line "..someone's gone liquid in the sheets.." on the original (album) version is replaced by "..someone's gone missing in the sheets..".

The record entered the UK Singles Chart at no. 32, remaining at the same position for a further week before dropping down. This was the final single release from Metamatic.

The single version is featured on the John Foxx compilation albums Modern Art - The Best of John Foxx (2001) and Glimmer - Best of John Foxx (2008). The latter also includes an "early version" of "No-One Driving". Live versions of the song are also included on the albums: Live From A Room (As Big As A City) (2006) and A New Kind of Man (2008).

The song remains a John Foxx standard and one of his best known songs and is performed live to this day, as John Foxx And The Maths.

Single release track listings
7" single disc (two track version)
 "No-One Driving"
 "Glimmer"

7" single disc (three track version)
 "No-One Driving"
 "Glimmer"
 "Mr. No"

7" double disc (gatefold sleeve)
 "No-One Driving"
 "Glimmer"
 "This City"
 "Mr. No"

7" German release (different sleeve artwork)
 "No-One Driving"
 "Metal Beat"

7" promo double disc cat. no. VS 338 A5 DJ (gatefold sleeve with sticker)
 "No-One Driving" (2.53 edit)
 "Glimmer"
 "This City"
 "Mr. No"

"This City" features on the compilation albums "Assembly" and "Metatronic", while "Glimmer" appears on the eponymous compilation album. 
All three B-sides were released together for the first time on the 2001 CD re-issue of the Metamatic album, and later on the 2007 re-issue.

Promo video
The promo video is slightly shorter than the single version at 2:53, with the second verse and chorus edited out. It features Foxx dressed in the typical grey suit jerkily dancing and miming to the song, accompanied in some scenes by two keyboard players. The video was included on the Metatronic DVD although does not feature on John Foxx's official YouTube page. Parts of the video were however used for the 2010 "Underpass" video edit by KARBORN, which is featured.

References

Sources and further reading
Metamatic - the official John Foxx website (discography section)
Quiet City - the music of John Foxx (discography section)
No-One Driving at discogs.com
Metamatic album at discogs.com 

1980 singles
John Foxx songs
Synth-pop songs
Songs about cars
Songs written by John Foxx
1980 songs
Virgin Records singles